Leung Yat Ho (born: 1968) is a former actor and wushu taolu athlete from Hong Kong. He was a two-time world champion in nanquan and was also a triple silver medalist at the Asian Games.

Competitive wushu career 

In 1989, Leung moved to Hong Kong to pursue a career in acting. He continued to seriously train wushu at this time, and won the silver medal in men's nanquan at the 1990 Asian Games in Beijing. A year later, he became the first world champion in nanquan at the 1991 World Wushu Championships. Leung then won a bronze medal in the 1993 World Wushu Championships Kuala Lumpur, silver medal in the 1994 Asian Games in Hiroshima, and was once again the world champion at the 1995 World Wushu Championships in Baltimore. While representing the SAR of Hong Kong, he first achieved a silver medal victory in the 1997 World Wushu Championships in Rome. For his last competition, Leung won the silver medal in men's nanquan at the 1998 Asian Games in Bangkok.

Filmography 

 Outlaw Brothers (1990)
 The Revenge of Angel (1990)
 Wei Si Li zhi ba wang xie jia (1991)
 Once Upon a Time in China II (1992)
 Once Upon a Time in China IV (1994)
 The Kung Fu Master (TV series) (1994)
 Shi cheng shen tan (1995)
 Kuang ye san qian xiang (1996)
 Another Meltdown (1998)

See also 

 List of Asian Games medalists in wushu

References

External links 
 

1968 births
Living people
Chinese wushu practitioners
Chinese martial artists
Medalists at the 1990 Asian Games
Medalists at the 1994 Asian Games
Medalists at the 1998 Asian Games
Asian Games silver medalists for Hong Kong
Asian Games medalists in wushu
Wushu practitioners at the 1990 Asian Games
Wushu practitioners at the 1994 Asian Games
Wushu practitioners at the 1998 Asian Games
Hong Kong martial artists
Hong Kong wushu practitioners